Jeremy Dale may refer to:

 Jeremy Dale (comics) (1979–2014), American comic book artist
 Jeremy Dale (racing driver) (born 1962), Canadian racing driver

See also
 
 Jerry Dale (born 1933), American former professional baseball umpire